Thomas Delbert Barr (January 23, 1931 – January 24, 2008) was a prominent lawyer at the law firm of Cravath, Swaine & Moore.

Early life
He was born in Kansas City, Missouri. He graduated from the University of Missouri–Kansas City in 1953 and Yale Law School, and served as an officer in the Marine Corps.

Legal work
He joined Cravath in 1958 and stayed with the firm for more than 40 years.

Barr is best known for representing the International Business Machines Corporation in a 13-year antitrust battle with the federal government, as well as satellite cases by competitors and the EEC. The government began the case in 1969 and dropped it in 1982. For his outstanding efforts and the scale of the case,  Barr is credited as the father of big-case litigation. The case is described in details in The Partners by James B. Stewart.

Other major cases included Powell v. McCormack, over the attempt to exclude Adam Clayton Powell Jr. from taking his seat in the US House of Representatives; the defense of Time Magazine in the libel case brought by Ariel Sharon, relating to the Sabra and Shatila massacre; the effort to recover on behalf of holders of defaulted municipal bonds issued by Washington Public Power Supply System (WPPSS); and the prosecution on behalf of the Federal Deposit Insurance Corporation (FDIC) against Drexel Burnham Lambert and Michael Milken over fraudulent junk bonds. His major pro bono work included cases for the Lawyers' Committee for Civil Rights Under Law.

See also

Bruce Bromley, his colleague and mentor at Cravath

External links
ABA Journal: Ex-Cravath Lawyer Dies, Father of ‘Big-Case Litigation’
TIME: The Case of the Century
Target: Drexel. Weapon: Tom Barr.

1931 births
2008 deaths
Lawyers from Kansas City, Missouri
20th-century American lawyers
University of Missouri alumni
Yale Law School alumni
United States Marine Corps officers
Cravath, Swaine & Moore people